Alice Cook may refer to:
 Alice Cook (figure skater) (born 1955), figure skater and sports reporter
 Alice Cook (professor) (1903–1998), Cornell University in the United States
 Alice Carter Cook (1868–1943), American botanist
 A. Grace Cook (Alice Grace Cook, 1877–1958), British astronomer
 Alice May Cook (1876–1960), British artist
 Alice Cook Fuller, née Cook, American writer and educator